is a quasi-national park in the Shiribeshi Subprefecture of Hokkaido, Japan.  On the coast of the Sea of Japan, there is a Marine Protected Area covering the west and north coast of Shakotan peninsula from Kamoenai to Otaru. The park also protects the area around the Mount Raiden and Niseko Volcanic Groups. Niseko-Shakotan-Otaru Kaigan Quasi-National Park was established in 1963.

According to the World Database on Protected Areas, this park protects the following species: 
 Prunus sargentii, a species of cherry tree
 Carcinactis ichikawai, a species of sea anemone
 Carcharodon carcharias, a species of shark
 Aptocyclus ventricosus, a species of lumpsucker
 Haliclyctus tenuis, species of true jellyfish
 Finella sp., a species of mollusk

See also
List of national parks of Japan

References

External links
  ニセコ積丹小樽海岸国定公園 , Japan Integrated Biodiversity Information System. Ministry of the Environment of Japan.

National parks of Japan
Parks and gardens in Hokkaido
Protected areas established in 1963